Soludos is a footwear company which was founded in 2010 by British native Nick Brown. The brand's espadrilles were inspired by the traditional Spanish shoe, which Brown found he missed when he came to New York City from the Spanish coast. He initially sold the shoes online from his apartment, and collaborated with Laura Hoffmann, Opening Ceremony and Jason Polan to promote the brand. The espadrilles were picked up by retailers including Ron Herman, Steven Alan, Nordstrom and Bloomingdale's. They are also sold at pop-up shops during the summer months. Soludos shoes have been featured in magazines Vogue and Harper's Bazaar, and have been worn by celebrities including Kate Bosworth, Anne Hathaway, Jennifer Garner and Michelle Monaghan. In 2018, Soludos now sells a variety of espadrilles, sneakers, loafers, boot, mules and sandals for women and smoking sneakers for men.

References 

Shoe companies of the United States